Bogati is a surname found in Nepal. They belong to the highest of the Chhetri community in Nepal. Mostly scattered around western Nepal and of military background. Some believe Gorkha to be their home land. Several families of whom came with the conquest of Kathmandu reside in the valley mainly in Lalitpur. Notable people with the surname include:

Babu Bogati, Nepalese singer and actor
Post Bahadur Bogati, (1953–2014) Nepalese politician
Sabitri Bogati, Nepalese politician
Tika Bogati, Nepalese athlete

Nepali-language surnames
Khas people
Surnames of Nepalese origin